Fabjan Tomić (born 15 June 1995) is a Croatian football goalkeeper, currently playing for NK Špansko.

Career
His father Sandro Tomić was also goalkeeper of Hajduk Split and his currently goalkeeping coach in Turkmenistan national football team. He started training football at the age of 6 at NK Zagreb, where his father had played. He followed his father to Hungary the following year and joined the Debreceni VSC academy and, when his father moved to Budapest, MTK Budapest FC, becoming fluent in Hungarian. After that, he moved back to his hometown, joining the HNK Hajduk Split academy.

He was promoted to the first team of Hajduk in January 2014 and after injuries to Hajduk's first and second choice keepers he stepped in and made seven appearances in his first season in the top flight of Croatian football, keeping one clean sheet.

In September 2016, Tomić joined NK Vrapče. He played there until February 2017, where he joined NK Junak Sinj. One year later he signed with NK Hrvatski Dragovoljac. In February 2019, he joined NK Špansko.

References

External links
 

Fabjan Tomić at hajduk.hr

1995 births
Living people
Footballers from Split, Croatia
Association football goalkeepers
Croatian footballers
Croatia youth international footballers
HNK Hajduk Split players
HNK Hajduk Split II players
NK Vitez players
NK Hrvatski Dragovoljac players
NK Rudeš players
NK Vrapče players
NK Junak Sinj players
Croatian Football League players
First Football League (Croatia) players